Austen Lake (May 23, 1895 – June 9, 1964) was an American writer, war correspondent during World War II, and a sports and general columnist for the Boston Evening Transcript and the Boston Record-American-Sunday Advertiser, in a career spanning more than 40 years until his death in 1964. "Galley Slave" (1965) is an anthology of his columns including writings on his many visits to Ireland. He played professional football for Buffalo and Philadelphia and had a tryout to play catcher for the New York Yankees before going to Europe during World War I where he served with the French Ambulance Corps before the United States entered the war. When the United States entered the war, he became a member of the newly formed United States Tank Corps, earning five battle stars and becoming a life member of "The Little Red Tank Society", a group formed by America's first tankers. During the years of World War II, he was a war correspondent, covering the London Blitz, the Normandy invasion, and the liberation of Paris. After D-Day, he went on to cover the exploits of the 4th Armored Division. After the war, he covered the 1958 Lebanon crisis and wrote a popular series on Ireland. During his college years, he was a football star at Lafayette College, afterwards studying portraiture at the École des Beaux-Arts in Paris. Known throughout his life as "Duke", he died at the age of 69.

References 
 Highbeam.org Ask the Boston Globe - who was Austen Lake?

External links 
 Boston Globe Archive Columnist Austen Lake Dies at 69
 Amazon.com Galley Slave, anthology of columns and stories by Austen Lake, on Amazon.com
 Baseball-Fever History of the Game: Meet the Sports Writers
 Sports Illustrated SI Vault: April 18, 1955: Austen Lake reports that Frankie Carbo has kept his word to Jim Norris and Tony DeMarco, the new welter champ, is safely in the IBC camp
 "Doping to Win" Milwaukee Sentinel article by Austen Lake

1895 births
1964 deaths
20th-century American journalists
American male journalists
American war correspondents of World War II